Charles A. and Annie Buddy House is a historic home located at St. Joseph, Missouri.  It was built in 1883, and is a two-story, rectangular, Italianate style masonry dwelling. It has a one-story rear wing, low-pitched truncated hipped roof, and front porch.

It was listed on the National Register of Historic Places in 2004.

References

Houses on the National Register of Historic Places in Missouri
Italianate architecture in Missouri
Houses completed in 1883
Houses in St. Joseph, Missouri
National Register of Historic Places in Buchanan County, Missouri